Luc C. Tartar is a French-American mathematician currently the University Professor of Mathematics, Emeritus at Carnegie Mellon University.

References

Year of birth missing (living people)
Living people
Carnegie Mellon University faculty
20th-century American mathematicians
French mathematicians
University of Paris alumni
21st-century American mathematicians